The 14th African Championships in Athletics were held in Brazzaville, Republic of Congo in July, 2004. Since African Championships is a biennial event, this edition was contested only a month before 2004 Summer Olympics. Thus some top athletes shunned the event. On the other hand, many athletes use the competition to prepare for the Olympics.

Medal summary

Men

Women

Medal table

See also
2004 in athletics (track and field)

References
African Championships – Day One. IAAF (2004-07-15). Retrieved on 2010-11-29.
African Championships – Day Two. IAAF (2004-07-16). Retrieved on 2010-11-29.
African Championships – Day Three. IAAF (2004-07-17). Retrieved on 2010-11-29.
African Championships - Final Day - Batangdon and Herbert shine. IAAF (2004-07-19). Retrieved on 2010-11-29.

External links
Medalists – GBR Athletics
Partial results

 
A
African Championships in Athletics
A
African Championships in Athletics
21st century in Brazzaville
Sports competitions in Brazzaville
July 2004 sports events in Africa